Beatriz's War is a 2013 drama film directed by Luigi Acquisto and Bety Reis. It is the first full-length feature film to be produced by East Timor. Its premiere was on 17 September 2013 in Dili. The film was shown in the first month to 30,000 East Timorese at outdoor screenings. It was screened at the 2013 Adelaide Film Festival. It won Golden Peacock (Best Film) at the 44th International Film Festival of India.

Plot
The film is based on the story of Martin Guerre in 16th-century France, transplanted into the setting of East Timor during the Indonesian occupation. The film revolves around the life of a young East Timorese woman named Beatriz. The story begins with Beatriz meeting her future husband, Tomas, as children. The two marry young and soon after their wedding the Indonesian invasion of East Timor begins. Beatriz fights for her true love and her country.

References

External links
 
 

2013 films
2013 drama films
East Timorese films
Tetum-language films